Some Voices is an EP by indie rock band Pinback.

Track listing
 "Some Voices" – 3:16
 "Trainer" – 2:43
 "Manchuria" – 2:41
 "June" – 7:17

References

2000 EPs
Pinback albums
Absolutely Kosher Records EPs